Tang-e Mohammad Haji (also Romanized as Tang-e Moḩammad Ḩājī; also known as Moḩammad Ḩājī and Moḩammad Ḩājjī) is a village in Shirvan Rural District, in the Central District of Borujerd County, Lorestan Province, Iran. At the 2006 census, its population was 137, in 31 families.

References 

Towns and villages in Borujerd County